The St. James Lutheran Church is a church and historic church building located in downtown Portland, Oregon, United States.

History
The congregation was founded in 1889 by missionaries as Portland's first English-speaking Lutheran church. The first pastor was Rev. M. L. Zweizig. The cornerstone for the present building was laid in May 1907. Many of the original fixtures are still in use in the building, including the marble baptismal font and oak pews. The church grew and thrived through the first half of the 20th century, and in 1956 added an educational annex, with space for classrooms and offices. The church was forced to remove the tower of the main building in 1951 due to structural deterioration. The tower was replaced in 1974 using historic photographs to match the original style and design as far as possible.

The St. James building was listed on the National Register of Historic Places in 1975.

Ministries
Today St. James is a member of the Evangelical Lutheran Church in America and draws members from a 30-mile radius because of its unique programs and traditional liturgy. In addition, it is home to a yearly series of concert vespers featuring the church cantatas of Johann Sebastian Bach embedded into a worship service, as they were originally designed to be performed.

See also
National Register of Historic Places listings in Southwest Portland, Oregon

References

External links

1891 establishments in Oregon
19th-century Lutheran churches in the United States
Churches completed in 1891
Churches in Portland, Oregon
Churches on the National Register of Historic Places in Oregon
Gothic Revival church buildings in Oregon
Lutheran churches in Oregon
National Register of Historic Places in Portland, Oregon
Portland Historic Landmarks
Southwest Portland, Oregon